The 14.5mm JDJ was created by SSK Industries of Wintersville, Ohio.

Overview
It uses the .50 BMG case with the neck opened up to accept a  bullet. It has a destructive device exemption. Only rifles chambered for the .50 BMG can be converted to this caliber.

References

Pistol and rifle cartridges
JDJ cartridges